The 2008 KB Extraliga Competition was a Czech domestic rugby club competition, operated by the Česká Rugbyová Unie (ČSRU). It began on August 16, 2008 with a match between Tatra Smíchov and Petrovice at the Stadion ragby Císařka in Prague, and ended with the final on November of that year with Tatra Smíchov beating Říčany 17-9 played on Synot Tip Arena in Prague.

Praga and Přelouč were added, increasing the number of teams to 10 from the 8 of the previous season.

Unlike most other years, the league was played over the course of only one year.

Table

Schedule and results
From the official ČSRU site. Within each weekend, matches are to be listed in the following order:
 By date.
 If matches are held on the same day, by kickoff time.
 Otherwise, in alphabetic order of home club.

Rounds 1 to 5
Round 1
 16 August, 11:00 — Tatra Smíchov 31 - 0 Petrovice
 16 August, 15:00 — Říčany 46 - 3 Přelouč
 16 August, 15:00 — Slavia Prague 12 - 6 Havířov
 16 August, 15:00 — Sparta Prague 5 - 25 Dragon Brno
 17 August, 14:00 — Praga 53 - 26 Vyškov

Round 2
 23 August, 14:00 — Petrovice 13 - 17 Praga
 23 August, 15:00 — Havířov 8 - 31 Tatra Smíchov
 23 August, 15:00 — Říčany 7 - 28 Slavia Prague
 23 August, 16:00 — Přelouč 6 - 32 Dragon Brno
 19 October, — Vyškov 14 - 54 Sparta Prague

Round 3
 30 August, 11:00 — Tatra Smíchov 37 - 27 Říčany
 30 August, 14:00 — Praga 75 - 28 Havířov
 30 August, 15:00 — Slavia Prague 48 - 13 Přelouč
 31 August, 15:00 — Sparta Prague 27 - 8 Petrovice
 2 September, 18:00 — Dragon Brno 31 - 15 Vyškov

Round 4
 6 September, 14:00 — Havířov 27 - 20 Sparta Prague
 6 September, 14:00 — Přelouč 13 - 19 Vyškov
 6 September, 14:00 — Slavia Prague 17 - 32 Tatra Smíchov
 6 September, 15:00 — Říčany 24 - 14 Praga
 7 September, 14:00 — Petrovice 12 - 17 Dragon Brno

Round 5
 13 September, 11:00 — Tatra Smíchov 91 - 6 Přelouč
 13 September, 14:00 — Praga 21 - 27 Slavia Prague
 13 September, 14:00 — Vyškov 6 - 22 Petrovice
 13 September, 15:00 — Dragon Brno 41 - 22 Havířov
 13 September, 16:00 — Sparta Prague 15 - 39 Říčany

Rounds 6 to 9
Round 6
 20 September, 11:00 — Havířov 12 - 7 Vyškov
 20 September, 15:00 — Přelouč 0 - 43 Petrovice
 20 September, 15:00 — Říčany 35 - 3 Dragon Brno
 20 September, 15:00 — Slavia Prague 36 - 6 Sparta Prague
 21 September, 16:00 — Tatra Smíchov 15 - 8 Praga

Round 7
 27 September, 13:00 — Praga 78 - 8 Přelouč
 27 September, 14:00 — Petrovice 102 - 0 Havířov
 27 September, 14:00 — Vyškov 17 - 46 Říčany
 27 September, 15:00 — Dragon Brno 18 - 14 Slavia Prague
 27 September, 15:00 — Sparta Prague 3 - 38 Tatra Smíchov

Round 8
 4 October, 14:00 — Praga 73 - 23 Sparta Prague
 4 October, 14:00 — Tatra Smíchov 34 - 12 Dragon Brno
 4 October, 15:00 — Říčany 46 - 10 Petrovice
 4 October, 16:00 — Přelouč 12 - 34 Havířov
 4 October, 15:00 — Slavia Prague 66 - 14 Vyškov

Round 9
 11 October, 14:00 — Havířov 6 - 41 Říčany
 11 October, 14:00 — Sparta Prague 53 - 3 Přelouč
 11 October, 14:00 — Vyškov 0 - 68 Tatra Smíchov
 11 October, 15:00 — Dragon Brno 22 - 23 Praga
 11 October, 14:30 — Petrovice 10 - 31 Slavia Prague

Semi-finals

Final

References

Extraliga
2008
Czech